Canadian English (CanE, CE, en-CA) encompasses the varieties of English native to Canada. According to the 2016 census, English was the first language of 19.4 million Canadians or 58.1% of the total population; the remainder spoke French (20.8%) or other languages (21.1%). In Quebec, 7.5% of the population are anglophone, as most of Quebec's residents are native speakers of Quebec French.

Phonologically, Canadian and American English are classified together as North American English, emphasizing the fact that most cannot distinguish the typical accents of the two countries by sound alone. While Canadian English tends to be closer to American English in most regards, it does possess elements from British English and some uniquely Canadian characteristics. The precise influence of American English, British English and other sources on Canadian English varieties has been the ongoing focus of systematic studies since the 1950s.

Canadians and Americans themselves often have trouble differentiating their own two accents, particularly when someone speaks with an urban Standard Canadian English accent because it sounds very similar to Western American English. There is also evidence that Standard Canadian English and Western American English have been undergoing a very similar vowel shift since the 1980s. Canadian English varies very little from Central Canada to British Columbia. But, some noticeably different accents can be found in the Atlantic provinces, most especially in Newfoundland with Newfoundland English. Accent differences can sometimes be heard between those who live in urban centres versus those living in rural settings.

In the early 20th century, western Canada was largely populated by farmers from Central and Eastern Europe who were not anglophones. At the time, most anglophones there were re-settlers from Ontario or Quebec who had British, Irish and/or Loyalist ancestry. Throughout the 20th century, the prairies underwent anglicization and linguistic homogenization through education and exposure to Canadian and American media.

History 
The term "Canadian English" is first attested in a speech by the Reverend A. Constable Geikie in an address to the Canadian Institute in 1857 (see DCHP-1 Online, s.v. "Canadian English", Avis et al., 1967). Geikie, a Scottish-born Canadian, reflected the Anglocentric attitude that would be prevalent in Canada for the next hundred years when he referred to the language as "a corrupt dialect", in comparison with what he considered the proper English spoken by immigrants from Britain.

Canadian English is the product of five waves of immigration and settlement over a period of more than two centuries. The first large wave of permanent English-speaking settlement in Canada, and linguistically the most important, was the influx of Loyalists fleeing the American Revolution, chiefly from the Mid-Atlantic States—as such, Canadian English is believed by some scholars to have derived from northern American English. Canadian English has been developing features of its own since the early 19th century. The second wave from Britain and Ireland was encouraged to settle in Canada after the War of 1812 by the governors of Canada, who were worried about American dominance and influence among its citizens. Further waves of immigration from around the globe peaked in 1910, 1960 and at the present time had a lesser influence, but they did make Canada a multicultural country, ready to accept linguistic change from around the world during the current period of globalization.

The languages of Aboriginal peoples in Canada started to influence European languages used in Canada even before widespread settlement took place, and the French of Lower Canada provided vocabulary, with words such as toque and portage, to the English of Upper Canada.

While the process of the making of Canadian English—its documentation and codification—goes back to the 1930s, the 1960s were the key period.  Like other social developments in Canada, the general acceptance of Canadian English has taken its time. According to a recent study, a noticeable shift in public discourse can only be seen in the middle of the first decade of the 2000s, when Canadian English was seen as a "given", generally accepted default variety, while before such statements were usually "balanced" by doubts.

Historical linguistics 

Studies on earlier forms of English in Canada are rare, yet connections with other work to historical linguistics can be forged. An overview of diachronic work on Canadian English, or diachronically relevant work, is Dollinger (2012, updated to 2017). Until the 2000s, basically all commentators on the history of CanE have argued from the "language-external" history, i.e. social and political history. An exception has been in the area of lexis, where Avis et al. 1967 Dictionary of Canadianisms on Historical Principles offered real-time historical data through its quotations. Recently, historical linguists have started to study earlier Canadian English with historical linguistic data. DCHP-1 is now available in open access. Most notably, Dollinger (2008) pioneered the historical corpus linguistic approach for English in Canada with CONTE (Corpus of Early Ontario English, 1776–1849) and offers a developmental scenario for 18th- and 19th-century Ontario. Recently, Reuter (2015), with a 19th-century newspaper corpus from Ontario, has confirmed the scenario laid out in Dollinger (2008).

 Historically, Canadian English included a class-based sociolect known as Canadian dainty. Treated as a marker of upper-class prestige in the 19th and early 20th centuries, Canadian dainty was marked by the use of some features of British English pronunciation, resulting in an accent similar, but not identical, to the Mid-Atlantic accent known in the United States. This accent faded in prominence following World War II, when it became stigmatized as pretentious, and is now almost never heard in modern Canadian life outside of archival recordings used in film, television or radio documentaries.

Spelling 

Canadian spelling of the English language combines British and American conventions, the two dominant varieties, and adds some domestic idiosyncrasies. For many words, American and British spelling are both acceptable. Spelling in Canadian English co-varies with regional and social variables, somewhat more so, perhaps, than in the two dominant varieties of English, yet general trends have emerged since the 1970s.

 Words such as realize and organization are usually given their Oxford spellings with a z.
 Words such as anesthesia and gynecology are usually or more commonly spelled as in American English rather than anaesthesia and gynaecology as in British English.
 French-derived words that in American English end with -or, such as color or honor, retain British spellings (colour and honour).
 French-derived words that in American English end with -er, such as fiber or center, retain British spellings (fibre and centre). This rule is much more relaxed than the -our rule, with kilometer (kilometre) being quite acceptable while meager (meagre) and somber (sombre) may not even be noticed.
 While the United States uses the Anglo-French spelling defense and offense (noun), most Canadians use the British spellings defence and offence. (But defensive and offensive are universal across all forms of English.)
 Some nouns, as in British English, take -ce while corresponding verbs take -se – for example, practice and licence are nouns while practise and license are the respective corresponding verbs. (But advice and advise, which have distinct pronunciations, are universal.)
 Canadian spelling sometimes retains the British practice of doubling the consonant -l- when adding suffixes to words even when the final syllable (before the suffix) is not stressed. Compare Canadian (and British) cancelled, counsellor, and travelling (more often than not in Canadian while always doubled in British) to American canceled, counselor, and traveling (fueled, fuelled, dueling and duelling are all common). In American English, this consonant is only doubled when stressed; thus, for instance, controllable and enthralling are universal. (But both Canadian and British English use balloted and profiting.)
 In other cases, Canadian and American usage differs from British spelling, such as in the case of nouns like curb and tire (of a wheel), which in British English are spelled kerb and tyre. (But tire in the sense of "make or become weary" is universal.)  Some other differences like Canadian and American aluminum versus aluminium elsewhere correspond to different pronunciations. 

Canadian spelling conventions can be partly explained by Canada's trade history. For instance, the British spelling of the word cheque probably relates to Canada's once-important ties to British financial institutions. Canada's automobile industry, on the other hand, has been dominated by American firms from its inception, explaining why Canadians use the American spelling of tire (hence, "Canadian Tire") and American terminology for automobiles and their parts (for example, truck instead of lorry, gasoline instead of petrol, trunk instead of boot).

Canada's political history has also had an influence on Canadian spelling. Canada's first prime minister, John A. Macdonald, once advised the Governor General of Canada to issue an order-in-council directing that government papers be written in the British style.

A contemporary reference for formal Canadian spelling is the spelling used for Hansard transcripts of the Parliament of Canada . Many Canadian editors, though, use the Canadian Oxford Dictionary, often along with the chapter on spelling in Editing Canadian English, and, where necessary (depending on context), one or more other references. 

Throughout part of the 20th century, some Canadian newspapers adopted American spellings, for example, color as opposed to the British-based colour. Some of the most substantial historical spelling data can be found in Dollinger (2010) and Grue (2013). The use of such spellings was the long-standing practice of the Canadian Press perhaps since that news agency's inception, but visibly the norm prior to World War II. The practice of dropping the letter u in such words was also considered a labour-saving technique during the early days of printing in which movable type was set manually. Canadian newspapers also received much of their international content from American press agencies, therefore it was much easier for editorial staff to leave the spellings from the wire services as provided.

In the 1990s, Canadian newspapers began to adopt the British spelling variants such as -our endings, notably with The Globe and Mail changing its spelling policy in October 1990. Other Canadian newspapers adopted similar changes later that decade, such as the Southam newspaper chain's conversion in September 1998. The Toronto Star adopted this new spelling policy in September 1997 after that publication's ombudsman discounted the issue earlier in 1997. The Star had always avoided using recognized Canadian spelling, citing the Gage Canadian Dictionary in their defence. Controversy around this issue was frequent. When the Gage Dictionary finally adopted standard Canadian spelling, the Star followed suit. Some publishers, e.g. Maclean's, continue to prefer American spellings.

Dictionaries 
The first Canadian dictionaries of Canadian English were edited by Walter Spencer Avis and published by Gage Ltd. The Beginner's Dictionary (1962), the Intermediate Dictionary (1964) and, finally, the Senior Dictionary (1967) were milestones in Canadian English lexicography. In November 1967 A Dictionary of Canadianisms on Historical Principles (DCHP) was published and completed the first edition of Gage's Dictionary of Canadian English Series. The DCHP documents the historical development of Canadian English words that can be classified as "Canadianisms". It therefore includes words such as mukluk, Canuck, and bluff, but does not list common core words such as desk, table or car. Many secondary schools in Canada use the graded dictionaries. The dictionaries have regularly been updated since: the Senior Dictionary, edited by Robert John Gregg, was renamed Gage Canadian Dictionary. Its fifth edition was printed beginning in 1997. Gage was acquired by Thomson Nelson around 2003. The latest editions were published in 2009 by HarperCollins. On 17 March 2017 a second edition of DCHP, the online Dictionary of Canadianisms on Historical Principles 2 (DCHP-2), was published. DCHP-2 incorporates the c. 10 000 lexemes from DCHP-1 and adds c. 1 300 novel meanings or 1 002 lexemes to the documented lexicon of Canadian English.

In 1997, the ITP Nelson Dictionary of the Canadian English Language was another product, but has not been updated since.

In 1998, Oxford University Press produced a Canadian English dictionary, after five years of lexicographical research, entitled The Oxford Canadian Dictionary. A second edition, retitled The Canadian Oxford Dictionary, was published in 2004. Just as the older dictionaries it includes uniquely Canadian words and words borrowed from other languages, and surveyed spellings, such as whether colour or color was the more popular choice in common use. Paperback and concise versions (2005, 2006), with minor updates, are available.

Phonology and phonetics 
In terms of the major sound systems (phonologies) of English around the world, Canadian English aligns most closely to American English, both being grouped together under a common North American English sound system; the mainstream Canadian accent ("Standard Canadian") is often compared to the very similar and largely overlapping "General American" accent, an accent widely spoken throughout the United States and perceived there as being relatively lacking in any noticeable regional features.

The provinces east of Ontario show the largest dialect diversity. Northern Canada is, according to William Labov, a dialect region in formation, and a homogeneous English dialect has not yet formed. A very homogeneous dialect exists in Western and Central Canada, a situation that is similar to that of the Western United States. Labov identifies an "Inland Canada" region that concentrates all of the defining features of the dialect centred on the Prairies, with periphery areas with more variable patterns including the metropolitan areas of Vancouver and Toronto. This dialect forms a dialect continuum with the far Western US English, sharply differentiated from the Inland Northern US English of the central and eastern Great Lakes region.

Canadian English raises the diphthong onsets of diphthongs /ai/ and /au/ to /ə, ʌ/ before voiceless segments.

Standard 

Standard Canadian English is socially defined. It is the variety spoken, in Chambers' (1998: 252) definition, by Anglophone or multilingual residents, who are second generation or later (i.e. born in Canada) and who live in urban settings. Applying this definition, c. 36% of the Canadian population speak Standard Canadian English in the 2006 population, with 38% in the 2011 census.

Regional variation 
The literature has for a long time conflated the notions of Standard Canadian English (StCE) and regional variation. While some regional dialects are close to Standard Canadian English, they are not identical to it. To the untrained ear, for instance, a BC middle-class speaker from a rural setting may sound like Standard Canadian English, but, given Chambers' definition, such a person, because of the rural provenance, would not be included in the accepted definition (see the previous section). The Atlas of North American English, while being the best source for US regional variation, is not a good source for Canadian regional variation, as its analysis is based on only 33 Canadian speakers. Boberg's (2005, 2008) studies offer the best data for the delimitation of dialect zones. The results for vocabulary and phonetics overlap to a great extent, which has allowed the proposal of dialect zones. Dollinger and Clarke distinguish between:
 West (B.C., Alberta, Saskatchewan, Manitoba; with B.C. a sub-zone on the lexical level)
 Ontario (with Northwestern Ontario a transition zone with the West)
 Quebec (concerning the c. 500 000 Anglophone speakers in the province, not the Francophone speakers of English)
 Maritimes (PEI, NS, NB, with PEI a subgroup on the lexical level)
 Newfoundland

Indigenous 

First Nations and Inuit from Northern Canada speak a version of Canadian English influenced by the phonology of their first languages. European Canadians in these regions are relatively recent arrivals, and have not produced a dialect that is distinct from southern Canadian English.

Maritimes 

Many in the Maritime provinces – Nova Scotia, New Brunswick and Prince Edward Island – have an accent that sounds more like Scottish English and, in some places, Irish English than General American. Outside of major communities, dialects can vary markedly from community to community, as well as from province to province, reflecting ethnic origin as well as a past in which there were few roads and many communities, with some villages very isolated. Into the 1980s, residents of villages in northern Nova Scotia could identify themselves by dialects and accents distinctive to their village. The dialects of Prince Edward Island are often considered the most distinct grouping.

The phonology of Maritimer English has some unique features:
 Cot–caught merger in effect, but toward a central vowel .
 No Canadian Shift of the short front vowels
 Pre-consonantal  is sometimes (though rarely) deleted.
 Like most varieties of CanE, Maritimer English contains Canadian raising.

Newfoundland 

The dialect spoken in the province of Newfoundland and Labrador, an autonomous dominion until 31 March 1949, is often considered the most distinctive Canadian English dialect. Some Newfoundland English differs in vowel pronunciation, morphology, syntax, and preservation of archaic adverbial-intensifiers. The dialect can vary markedly from community to community, as well as from region to region, reflecting ethnic origin as well as a past in which there were few roads and many communities, and fishing villages in particular remained very isolated. A few speakers have a transitional pin–pen merger.

Ontario 
Canadian raising is quite strong throughout the province of Ontario, except within the Ottawa Valley. The Canadian Shift is also a common vowel shift found in Ontario.

In the southern part of Southwestern Ontario (roughly in the line south from Sarnia to St. Catharines), despite the existence of the many characteristics of West/Central Canadian English, many speakers, especially those under 30, speak a dialect which is influenced by the Inland Northern American English dialect, though there are minor differences such as Canadian raising (e.g. "ice" vs "my").

The north and northwestern parts of Southwestern Ontario, the area consisting of the Counties of Huron, Bruce, Grey, and Perth, referred to as the "Queen's Bush" in the 19th century, did not experience communication with the dialects of the southern part of Southwestern Ontario and Central Ontario until the early 20th century. Thus, a strong accent similar to Central Ontarian is heard, yet many different phrasings exist. It is typical in the area to drop phonetic sounds to make shorter contractions, such as: prolly (probably), goin''' (going), and "Wuts goin' on tonight? D'ya wanna do sumthin'?" It is particularly strong in the County of Bruce, so much that it is commonly referred to as being the Bruce Cownian (Bruce Countian) accent. Also 'er' sounds are often pronounced 'air', with "were" sounding more like "wear".

This is not unique to Toronto; Atlanta is often pronounced "Atlanna" by residents. In the Greater Toronto Area, the th sound  is sometimes pronounced . Sometimes  is elided altogether, resulting in "Do you want this one er'iss one?" In the area north of the Regional Municipality of York and south of Parry Sound, notably among those who were born in the surrounding communities, the cutting down of syllables and consonants often heard, e.g. "probably" is reduced to "prolly" or "probly" when used as a response. In Greater Toronto, the diphthong tends to be fronted (as a result the word about is pronounced as ). The Greater Toronto Area is diverse linguistically, with 43 percent of its people having a mother tongue other than English. As a result Toronto English has distinctly more variability than Inland Canada.

In Eastern Ontario, Canadian raising is not as strong as it is in the rest of the province. In Prescott and Russell, parts of Stormont-Dundas-Glengarry and Eastern Ottawa, French accents are often mixed with English ones due to the high Franco-Ontarian population there. In Lanark County, Western Ottawa and Leeds-Grenville and the rest of Stormont-Dundas-Glengarry, the accent spoken is nearly identical to that spoken in Central Ontario and the Quinte area.

A linguistic enclave has also formed in the Ottawa Valley, heavily influenced by original Scottish, Irish, and German settlers, and existing along the Ontario-Quebec boundary, which has its own distinct accent known as the Ottawa Valley twang (or brogue). Phonetically, the Ottawa Valley twang is characterized by the lack of Canadian raising as well as the cot–caught merger, two common elements of mainstream Canadian English. This accent is quite rare in the region today.

 Quebec 

English is a minority language in Quebec (with French the majority), but has many speakers in Montreal, the Eastern Townships and in the Gatineau-Ottawa region. A person whose mother tongue is English and who still speaks English is called an Anglophone, versus a Francophone, or French speaker.

Many people in Montreal distinguish between words like marry versus merry and parish versus perish, which are homophones to most other speakers of Canadian English. Quebec Anglophones generally pronounce French street names in Montreal as French words. On the other hand, Anglophones pronounce the final d as in Bernard and Bouchard; the word Montreal is pronounced as an English word and Rue Lambert-Closse is known as Clossy Street (vs French /klɔs/). In the city of Montreal, especially in some of the western suburbs like Côte-St-Luc and Hampstead, there is a strong Jewish influence in the English spoken in those areas. A large wave of Jewish immigration from Eastern Europe and the former Soviet Union before and after World War II is also evident today. Their English has a strong Yiddish influence, and there are some similarities to English spoken in New York. Words used mainly in Quebec and especially in Montreal are: stage for "apprenticeship" or "internship", copybook for a notebook, dépanneur or dep for a convenience store, and guichet for an ABM/ATM. It is also common for Anglophones, particularly those of Greek or Italian descent, to use translated French words instead of common English equivalents such as "open" and "close" for "on" and "off" or "Open the lights, please" for "Turn on the lights, please".

 West 
Western Canadian English describes the English spoken in the four most western provinces—British Columbia, Alberta, Saskatchewan, and Manitoba. British Columbia, in particular is a sub-zone on the lexical level.
British Columbia

British Columbia English shares dialect features with both Standard Canadian English and the American Pacific Northwest English. In Vancouver, speakers exhibit more vowel retraction of  before nasals than people from Toronto, and this retraction may become a regional marker of West Coast English.  raising (found words such as bag, vague and bagel), a prominent feature in western American speakers, is also found in Vancouver speakers. Younger speakers in the Greater Vancouver area do not raise  as much, but keep the drop in intonation, causing "about" to sound slightly like "a baht", in the same vein as certain south Californian "surfer accents". The "o" in such words as holy, goal, load, know, etc. is pronounced as a close-mid back rounded vowel, but not as rounded as in the Prairies where there are strong Scandinavian, Slavic and German influences, which can lend to a more stereotypical "Canadian" accent.

 Grammar 

There are a handful of syntactical practices unique to Canadian English. When writing, Canadians may start a sentence with As well, in the sense of "in addition"; this construction is a Canadianism.

North American English prefers have got to have to denote possession or obligation (as in I've got a car vs. I have a car); Canadian English differs from American English in tending to eschew plain got (I got a car), which is a common third option in very informal US English.

The grammatical construction "be done something" means roughly "have/has finished something". For example, "I am done my homework" and "The dog is done dinner" are genuine sentences in this dialect, respectively meaning "I have finished my homework" and "The dog has finished dinner". Another example, "Let's start after you're done all the coffee", means "Let's start after you've finished all the coffee". This is not exactly the same as the standard construction "to be done with something", since "She is done the computer" can only mean "She is done with the computer" in one sense: "She has finished (building) the computer".Fruehwald, Josef; Myler, Neil (2015). "I'm done my homework—Case assignment in a stative passive". Linguistic Variation, 15(2), Section 3.1.1.

 Date and time notation 

Date and time notation in Canadian English is a mixture of British and American practices. The date can be written in the form of either "" or "1 July 2017"; the latter is common in more formal writing and bilingual contexts. The Government of Canada only recommends writing all-numeric dates in the form of YYYY-MM-DD (e.g. 2017-07-01), following ISO 8601. Nonetheless, the traditional DD/MM/YY and MM/DD/YY systems remain in everyday use, which can be interpreted in multiple ways: 01/07/17 can mean either 1 July 2017 or 7 January 2017. Private members' bills have repeatedly attempted to clarify the situation. In business communication and filing systems the YYMMDD is used to assist in automatic ordering of electronic files.

The government also recommends use of the 24-hour clock, which is widely used in contexts such as transportation schedules, parking meters, and data transmission. Many speakers of English use the 12-hour clock in everyday speech, even when reading from a 24-hour display, similar to the use of the 24-hour clock in the United Kingdom.

 Vocabulary 
Where Canadian English shares vocabulary with other English dialects, it tends to share most with American English, but also has many non-American terms distinctively shared instead with Britain. In addition, the vocabulary of Canadian English also features some words that are seldom (if ever) found elsewhere. A good resource for these and other words is the Dictionary of Canadianisms on Historical Principles, which is currently being revised at the University of British Columbia in Vancouver, British Columbia. The Canadian public appears to take interest in unique "Canadianisms": words that are distinctively characteristic of Canadian English—though perhaps not exclusive to Canada; there is some disagreement about the extent to which "Canadianism" means a term actually unique to Canada, with such an understanding possibly overstated by the popular media."Uniquely Canadian, Eh? " Review of Barber, Katherine by Stefan Dollinger. 2007. Only in Canada You Say: A Treasury of Canadian Language. Oxford University Press.

 Education 
The term college, which refers to post-secondary education in general in the US, refers in Canada to either a post-secondary technical or vocational institution, or to one of the colleges that exist as federated schools within some Canadian universities. Most often, a college is a community college, not a university. It may also refer to a CEGEP in Quebec. In Canada,  might denote someone obtaining a diploma in business management (this would be an associate degree in the United States); while  is the term for someone earning a bachelor's degree.

Within the public school system the chief administrator of a school is generally "the principal", as in the United States, but the term is not used preceding their name, i.e., "Principal Smith". The assistant to the principal is not titled as "assistant principal", but rather as "vice-principal", although the former is not unknown. This usage is identical to that in Northern Ireland.

Canadian universities publish calendars or schedules, not catalogs as in the US. Canadian students write or take exams (in the US, students generally "take" exams while teachers "write" them); they rarely sit them (standard British usage). Those who supervise students during an exam are sometimes called invigilators as in Britain, or sometimes proctors as in the US; usage may depend on the region or even the individual institution.

Successive years of school are usually referred to as grade one, grade two, and so on. In Quebec, the speaker (if Francophone) will often say primary one, primary two (a direct translation from the French), and so on; while Anglophones will say grade one, grade two. (Compare American first grade, second grade (sporadically found in Canada), and English/Welsh Year 1, Year 2, Scottish/Northern Irish Primary 1, Primary 2 or P1, P2, and Southern Irish First Class, Second Class and so on.). The year of school before grade 1 is usually called "Kindergarten", with the exception of Nova Scotia, where it is called "grade primary".

In the US, the four years of high school are termed the freshman, sophomore, junior, and senior years (terms also used for college years); in Canada, the specific levels are used instead (i.e., "grade nine"). As for higher education, only the term freshman (often reduced to frosh) has some currency in Canada. The American usages "sophomore", "junior" and "senior" are not used in Canadian university terminology, or in speech. The specific high-school grades and university years are therefore stated and individualized; for example, the grade 12s failed to graduate; John is in his second year at McMaster. The "first year", "third year" designation also applies to Canadian law school students, as opposed to the common American usage of "1L", "2L" and "3L".

Canadian students use the term marks (more common in England) or grades (more common in the US) to refer to their results. Usage is very mixed, although marks more commonly refer to a single score whereas grades often refers to the cumulative score in that class.

 Units of measurement 
Unlike in the United States, use of metric units within a majority of (but not all) industries is standard in Canada, as a result of the partial national adoption of the metric system during the mid-to-late 1970s that was eventually stalled; this has spawned some colloquial usages such as klick for kilometre (as also heard in the US military).

Nonetheless, US units are still used in many situations. Imperial volumes are also used, albeit very rarely—although many Canadians and Americans mistakenly conflate the measurement systems despite their slight differences from each other.

For example, most English Canadians state their weight and height in pounds and feet/inches, respectively. This is also the case for many Quebec Francophones. Distances while playing golf are always marked and discussed in yards, though official scorecards may also show metres. Temperatures for cooking or pools are often given in Fahrenheit, while the weather is given in Celsius. Directions in the Prairie provinces are sometimes given using miles, because the country roads generally follow the mile-based grid of the Dominion Land Survey. Motor vehicle speed limits are measured in kilometres per hour.

Canadians measure property, both residential and commercial, floor areas are in square feet or square metres, property is in square feet, square metres, acres or hectares. Fuel efficiency is less frequently discussed in miles per US gallon, more often the metric L/100 km despite gasoline being sold by the litre. The Letter paper size of 8.5 inches × 11 inches is used instead of the international and metric equivalent A4 size of 210 mm × 297 mm. Beer cans are 355 mL (12 US oz), while beer bottles are typically 341 mL (12 Imperial oz), and draft beer is sold in various units; US or Imperial oz, US or Imperial pint, or occasionally mL.

Building materials are used in soft conversions of imperial sizes, but often purchased in relation to the imperial sizes. For example, 8-inch concrete masonry units can be referred to as an 8-inch CMU or 190 CMU. The actual material used in the US and Canada is the same.

 Transport 
 Although Canadian lexicon features both railway and railroad, railway is the usual term in naming (witness Canadian National Railway and Canadian Pacific Railway), though railroad can be heard fairly frequently in some regions; most rail terminology in Canada follows American usage (for example, ties and cars rather than sleepers and carriages).
 A two-way ticket can be either a round-trip (American term) or a return (British term).
 The terms highway (for example, Trans-Canada Highway), expressway (Central Canada, as in the Gardiner Expressway) and freeway (Sherwood Park Freeway, Edmonton) are often used to describe various high-speed roads with varying levels of access control. Generally, but not exclusively, highway refers to any provincially funded road regardless of its access control. Often such roads will be numbered. Similar to the US, the terms expressway and freeway are often used interchangeably to refer to controlled-access highways, that is, divided highways with access only at grade-separated interchanges (for example, a 400-Series Highway in Ontario).Expressway may also refer to a limited-access road that has control of access but has at-grade junctions, railway crossings (for example, the Harbour Expressway in Thunder Bay.) Sometimes the term Parkway is also used (for example, the Hanlon Parkway in Guelph). In Saskatchewan, the term 'grid road' is used to refer to minor highways or rural roads, usually gravel, referring to the 'grid' upon which they were originally designed. In Quebec, freeways and expressways are called autoroutes.

In Alberta, the generic Trail is often used to describe a freeway, expressway or major urban street (for example, Deerfoot Trail, Macleod Trail or Crowchild Trail in Calgary, Yellowhead Trail, Victoria Trail or Mark Messier/St.Albert Trail in Edmonton). The British term motorway is not used. The American terms turnpike and tollway for a toll road are not common. The term throughway or thruway was used for first tolled limited-access highways (for example, the Deas Island Throughway, now Highway 99, from Vancouver, BC, to Blaine, Washington, USA or the Saint John Throughway (Highway 1) in Saint John, NB), but this term is not common anymore. In everyday speech, when a particular roadway is not being specified, the term highway is generally or exclusively used.
 A railway at-grade junction can be called a level crossing, as well as the term grade crossing, which is commonly used in the US.
 A railway or highway crossing overhead is an overpass or underpass, depending on which part of the crossing is referred to (the two are used more or less interchangeably); the British term flyover is sometimes used in Ontario, and in the Maritimes as well as on occasion in the prairies (such as the 4th avenue flyover in Calgary, Alberta), subway is also used.
 In Quebec, English speakers often use the word "metro" to mean subway. Non-native Anglophones of Quebec will also use the designated proper title "Metro" to describe the Montreal subway system.
 The term Texas gate refers to the type of metal grid called a cattle guard in American English or a cattle grid in British English.
 Depending on the region, large trucks used to transport and deliver goods are referred to as 'transport trucks' (e.g., used in Ontario and Alberta) or 'transfer trucks' (e.g., used in Prince Edward Island)

 Politics 
 While in standard usage the terms prime minister and premier are interchangeable terms for the head of an elected parliamentary government, Canadian English today generally follows a usage convention of reserving the title prime minister for the federal first minister and referring to provincial or territorial leaders as premiers. Because Canadian French does not have separate terms for the two positions, using  for both, the title prime minister is sometimes seen in reference to a provincial leader when a Francophone is speaking or writing English. Also, until the 1970s the leader of the Ontario provincial government was officially styled prime minister.
 When a majority of the elected members of the House of Commons or a provincial legislature are not members of the same party as the government, the situation is referred to as a minority government rather than a hung Parliament.
 To table a document in Canadian, in parliamentary usage, is to introduce or present it (as in Britain), whereas in the US it means to postpone consideration until a later date, often indefinitely. While the introduction meaning is the most common sense in non-parliamentary usage, the presentation meaning is also used in Canada. The Canadian Oxford Dictionary simply recommends avoiding the term in non-parliamentary context.
 In Canada, a committee is struck, whereas in the US committees are appointed, formed, or created, etc.
 Several political terms are more in use in Canada than elsewhere, including riding (as a general term for a parliamentary constituency or electoral district, this term is unique to Canada). The term reeve was at one time common for the equivalent of a mayor in some smaller municipalities in British Columbia and Ontario, but is now falling into disuse. The title is still used for the leader of a rural municipality in Saskatchewan, parts of Alberta, and Manitoba.
 The term Tory, used in Britain with a similar meaning, denotes a supporter of the present-day federal Conservative Party of Canada, the historic federal or provincial Progressive Conservative Party. The term Red Tory is also used to denote the more socially liberal wings of the Tory parties. Blue Tory is less commonly used, and refers to more strict fiscal (rather than social) conservatism. The US use of Tory to mean the Loyalists in the time of the American Revolution is not used in Canada, where they are called United Empire Loyalists, or simply Loyalists.
 Members of the Liberal Party of Canada or a provincial Liberal party are sometimes referred to as Grits. Historically, the term comes from the phrase Clear Grit, used in Victorian times in Canada to denote an object of quality or a truthful person. The term was assumed as a nickname by Liberals by the 1850s.
 The term "Socred" is no longer common due to its namesake party's decline, but referred to members of the Social Credit Party, and was particularly common in British Columbia. It was not used for Social Credit members from Quebec, nor generally used for the federal caucus of that party; in both cases , the French term, was used in English.
 Members of the Senate are referred to by the title "Senator" preceding their name, as in the United States. Members of the House of Commons of Canada, following British parliamentary nomenclature, are termed "Members of Parliament", and are referred to as "Jennifer Jones, MP" during their term of office only. Senators and members of the Privy Council are styled "The Honourable" for life, and the Prime Minister of Canada is styled "The Right Honourable" for life, as is the Chief Justice of the Supreme Court and the Governor General. This honorific may also be bestowed by Parliament, as it was to retiring deputy prime minister Herb Gray in 1996. Members of provincial legislatures do not have a pre-nominal style, except in certain provinces, such as Nova Scotia where members of the Queen's Executive Council of Nova Scotia are styled "The Honourable" for life, and are entitled to the use of the post-nominal letters "ECNS". The Cabinet of Ontario serves concurrently (and not for life) as the Executive Council of Ontario, while serving members are styled "The Honourable", but are not entitled to post-nominal letters.
 Members of provincial/territorial legislative assemblies are called MLAs in all provinces and territories except: Ontario, where they have been called Members of Provincial Parliament (MPPs) since 1938; Quebec, where they have been called Members of the National Assembly (MNAs) since 1968; and Newfoundland and Labrador, where they are called Members of the House of Assembly (MHAs). Each abbreviation is used as a post-nominal during terms of office only.

 Law 
Lawyers in all parts of Canada, except Quebec, which has its own civil law system, are called "barristers and solicitors" because any lawyer licensed in any of the common law provinces and territories must pass bar exams for, and is permitted to engage in, both types of legal practice in contrast to other common-law jurisdictions such as England, Wales and Ireland where the two are traditionally separated (i.e., Canada has a fused legal profession). The words lawyer and counsel (not counsellor) predominate in everyday contexts; the word attorney refers to any personal representative. Canadian lawyers generally do not refer to themselves as "attorneys", a term that is common in the United States.

The equivalent of an American district attorney, meaning the barrister representing the state in criminal proceedings, is called a crown attorney (in Ontario), crown counsel (in British Columbia), crown prosecutor or the crown, on account of Canada's status as a constitutional monarchy in which the Crown is the locus of state power.

The words advocate and notary – two distinct professions in Quebec civil law – are used to refer to that province's approximate equivalents of barrister and solicitor, respectively. It is not uncommon for English-speaking advocates in Quebec to refer to themselves in English as "barrister(s) and solicitor(s)", as most advocates chiefly perform what would traditionally be known as "solicitor's work", while only a minority of advocates actually appear in court. In Canada's common law provinces and territories, the word notary means strictly a notary public.

Within the Canadian legal community itself, the word solicitor is often used to refer to any Canadian lawyer in general (much like the way the word attorney is used in the United States to refer to any American lawyer in general). Despite the conceptual distinction between barrister and solicitor, Canadian court documents would contain a phrase such as "John Smith, solicitor for the Plaintiff" even though "John Smith" may well himself be the barrister who argues the case in court. In a letter introducing him/herself to an opposing lawyer, a Canadian lawyer normally writes something like "I am the solicitor" for Mr. Tom Jones."

The word litigator is also used by lawyers to refer to a fellow lawyer who specializes in lawsuits even though the more traditional word barrister is still employed to denote the same specialization.

Judges of Canada's superior courts, which exist at the provincial and territorial levels, are traditionally addressed as "My Lord" or "My Lady". This varies by jurisdiction, and some superior court judges prefer the titles "Mister Justice" or "Madam Justice" to "Lordship".

Masters are addressed as "Mr. Master" or simply "Sir." In British Columbia, masters are addressed as "Your Honour."Judges of provincial or inferior courts are traditionally referred to in person as "Your Honour". Judges of the Supreme Court of Canada and of the federal-level courts prefer the use of "Mister/Madam (Chief) Justice". Justices of The Peace are addressed as "Your Worship". "Your Honour" is also the correct form of address for a Lieutenant Governor.

A serious crime is called an indictable offence, while a less-serious crime is called a summary offence. The older words felony and misdemeanour, which are still used in the United States, are not used in Canada's current Criminal Code (R.S.C. 1985, c. C-46) or by today's Canadian legal system. As noted throughout the Criminal Code, a person accused of a crime is called the accused and not the defendant, a term used instead in civil lawsuits.

In Canada, visible minority refers to a non-aboriginal person or group visibly not one of the majority race in a given population. The term comes from the Canadian Employment Equity Act, which defines such people as "persons, other than Aboriginal people, who are non-Caucasian in race or non-white in colour." The term is used as a demographic category by Statistics Canada. The qualifier "visible" is used to distinguish such minorities from the "invisible" minorities determined by language (English vs. French) and certain distinctions in religion (Catholics vs. Protestants).

A county in British Columbia means only a regional jurisdiction of the courts and justice system and is not otherwise connected to governance as with counties in other provinces and in the United States. The rough equivalent to "county" as used elsewhere is a "Regional District".

 Places 
Distinctive Canadianisms are:
 bachelor: bachelor apartment, an apartment all in a single room, with a small bathroom attached ("They have a bachelor for rent"). The usual American term is studio. In Quebec, this is known as a one-and-a-half apartment; some Canadians, especially in Prince Edward Island, call it a loft. In other  provinces loft refers to a 2nd floor in  a condo unit or bungalow usually with 2nd floor bedrooms   
 camp: in Northern Ontario, it refers to what is called a cottage in the rest of Ontario; often more specifically to a vacation home not directly adjacent to a body of water,  and a cabin in the West. It is also used, to a lesser extent, in New Brunswick, Nova Scotia, as well as in parts of New England. It generally refers to vacation houses in rural areas.
 fire hall: fire station, firehouse.
 height of land: a drainage divide. Originally American.
 parkade: a parking garage, especially in the West.
 washroom: the general term for what is normally named public toilet or lavatory in Britain. In the United States (where it originated) the word was mostly replaced by restroom in the 20th century. Generally used only as a technical or commercial term outside of Canada. The word bathroom is also used.
 Indian reserve, rather than the US term federal Indian reservation. Often shortened to reserve, especially when the meaning is clear from context; another slang variant of this term is the shortened res or (more commonly) rez. Not to be confused with res, which in the context of universities refers strictly to residences or halls of residence (compare to the US American dorms or dormitories). Therefore, the sentences when I lived on rez and when I lived in res mean very different things. The territory of the particular band nation is usually referred to on a map as (Band name here) First Nations I.R.  
 rancherie: the residential area of a First Nation reserve, used in BC only.
 quiggly hole and/or quiggly: the depression in the ground left by a kekuli or pithouse. Groups of them are called "quiggly hole towns". Used in the BC Interior only.
 gas bar: a filling station (gas station) with a central island, having pumps under a fixed metal or concrete awning.
 booze can: an after-hours establishment where alcohol is served, often illegally.
 dépanneur, or the diminutive form dep, is often used by English speakers in Quebec. This is because convenience stores are called dépanneurs in Canadian French.
 snye, a side-stream channel that rejoins a larger river, creating an island.

 Daily life 
Terms common in Canada, Britain and Ireland but less frequent or nonexistent in the United States are:
 tin (as in tin of tuna), for can, especially among older speakers. Among younger speakers, can is more common, with tin referring to a can which is wider than it is tall as in "a tin of sardines" as opposed to a "can of soup".
 cutlery, for silverware or flatware, where the material of which the utensil is made is not of consequence to the context in which it is used.
 serviette, especially in Eastern Canada, for a paper table napkin.
 tap, conspicuously more common than faucet in everyday usage.

The following are more or less distinctively Canadian:
 ABM, bank machine: synonymous with ATM (which is also used, but much more widely than ABM by financial organizations in the country).
 BFI bin: Dumpster, after a prominent Canadian waste management company, BFI Canada (which was eventually bought out and merged to become Waste Connections of Canada) in provinces where that company does business; compare to other generic trademarks such as Kleenex, Xerox, and even Dumpster itself.
 chesterfield: originally British and internationally used (as in classic furnishing terminology) to refer to a sofa whose arms are the same height as the back, it is a term for any couch or sofa in Canada (and, to some extent, Northern California). Once a hallmark of CanE, chesterfield, as with settee and davenport, is now largely in decline among younger generations in the western and central regions. Couch is now the most common term; sofa is also used.
 dart: cigarette, used primarily by adolescents and young adults.
 dressing gown or housecoat or bathrobe: a dressing gown and house coat can be of silk or cotton, usually an attractive outer layer, while a bathrobe is made of absorbent fabric like a towel.  in the United States, called a bathrobe.
 eavestrough: rain gutter. Also used, especially in the past, in the Northern and Western United States; the first recorded usage is in Herman Melville's Moby-Dick: "The tails tapering down that way, serve to carry off the water, d'ye see. Same with cocked hats; the cocks form gable-end eave-troughs , Flask."
 flush: toilet, used primarily by older speakers throughout the Maritimes.
 garburator: (rhymes with carburetor) a garbage disposal.
 homogenized milk or homo milk: milk containing 3.25% milk fat, typically called "whole milk" in the United States.
 hydro: a common synonym for electrical service, used primarily in New Brunswick, Quebec, Ontario, Manitoba and British Columbia. Most of the power in these provinces is generated through hydroelectricity, and suppliers' company names incorporate the term "Hydro". Usage: "I didn't pay my hydro bill so they shut off my lights." Hence hydrofield or hydro corridor, a line of electricity transmission towers, usually in groups cutting across a city, and hydro lines/poles, electrical transmission lines/poles. These usages of hydro are also standard in the Australian state of Tasmania. Also in slang usage can refer to hydroponically grown marijuana.
 loonie: the Canadian one-dollar coin; derived from the use of the common loon on the reverse. The toonie (less commonly spelled tooney, twooney, twoonie) is the two-dollar coin. Loonie is also used to refer to the Canadian currency, particularly when discussing the exchange rate with the US dollar; loonie and toonie describe coinage specifically. (for example, "I have a dollar in pennies" versus "I have three loonies in my pocket").
 pencil crayon: coloured pencil.
 pogie or pogey: term referring to unemployment insurance, which is now officially called Employment Insurance in Canada. Derived from the use of pogey as a term for a poorhouse. Not used for welfare, in which case the term is "the dole", as in "he's on the dole, eh?".
 parkade: multistorey parking garage.

 Apparel 
The following are common in Canada, but not in the United States or the United Kingdom.
 runners: running shoes, especially in Western Canada. Also used in Australian English and Irish English.Machismo ... or masochism? , The Irish Times – Saturday 22 March 2008 Atlantic Canada prefers sneakers while central Canada (including Quebec and Ontario) prefers running shoes.
 touque (also spelled toque or tuque): a knitted winter hat. A similar hat would be called a beanie in the western United States and a watch cap in the eastern United States, though these forms are generally closer-fitting, and may lack a brim as well as a pompom. There seems to be no exact equivalent outside Canada, since the tuque is of French Canadian origin.
 bunnyhug: a hooded sweatshirt, with or without a zipper. Used mainly in Saskatchewan.

 Food and beverage 
 Most Canadians as well as Americans in the Northwest, North Central, Prairie and Inland North prefer pop over soda to refer to a carbonated beverage, but soda is understood to mean the same thing, in contrast to British English where soda refers specifically to soda water (US/Canadian seltzer water). Soft drink is also extremely common throughout Canada.
 What Americans call Canadian bacon is named back bacon in Canada, or, if it is coated in cornmeal or ground peas, cornmeal bacon or peameal bacon.
 What most Americans call a candy bar is usually known as a chocolate bar (as in the United Kingdom). In certain areas surrounding the Bay of Fundy, it is sometimes known as a nut bar; this use is more popular in older generations. Legally only bars made of solid chocolate may be labelled chocolate bars.
 Even though the terms French fries and fries are used by Canadians, some speakers use the word chips (and its diminutive, chippies) (chips is always used when referring to fish and chips, as elsewhere).
 brown bread refers to whole-wheat bread, as in "Would you like white or brown bread for your toast?"
 An expiry date is the term used for the date when a perishable product will go bad (similar to the UK Use By date). The term expiration date is more common in the United States (where expiry date is seen mostly on the packaging of Asian food products). The term Best Before also sees common use, where although not spoiled, the product may not taste "as good".
 double-double: a cup of coffee with two measures of cream and two of sugar, most commonly associated with the Tim Hortons chain of coffee shops.
 Canadianisms relating to alcohol:
 mickey: a  bottle of hard liquor (informally called a pint in the Maritimes and the United States). In Newfoundland, this is almost exclusively referred to as a "flask". In the United States, "mickey", or "Mickey Finn", refers to a drink laced with drugs.
 two-six, twenty-sixer, twixer: a  bottle of hard liquor (called a quart in the Maritimes). The word handle is less common. Similarly, a  bottle of hard liquor is known as a forty and a  bottle is known as a sixty or half gallon in Nova Scotia.
 Texas mickey (especially in Saskatchewan, New Brunswick and Nova Scotia; more often a "Saskatchewan mickey" in western Canada): a  bottle of hard liquor. (Despite the name, Texas mickeys are generally unavailable outside of Canada.)
 two-four: a case of 24 beers, also known as a case in Eastern Canada, or a flat in Western Canada (referencing that cans of beer are often sold in packages of six, with four packages to a flat box for shipping and stacking purposes).
 six-pack, half-sack, half-case, or poverty-pack: a case of six beers
 poutine: a snack of french fries topped with cheese curds and hot gravy.
 There are also genericized trademarks used in Canada:
 cheezies: cheese puffs. The name is a genericized trademark based on a brand of crunchy cheese snack sold in Canada.
 Kraft Dinner or "KD": for any packaged dry macaroni and cheese mix, even when it is not produced by Kraft.
 freezie: A frozen flavoured sugar water snack common worldwide, but known by this name exclusively in Canada.
 dainty: a fancy cookie, pastry, or square served at a social event (usually plural). Used in western Canada.
 Smarties: a bean-sized, small candy-covered chocolate, similar to plain M&M's. This is also seen in British English. Smarties in the United States refer to small tart powdered disc sold in rolls; in Canada these tart candies are sold as "Rockets".

 Prairies (Manitoba, Saskatchewan and Alberta) 
A strong Canadian raising exists in the prairie regions together with certain older usages such as chesterfield and front room also associated with the Maritimes. Aboriginal Canadians are a larger and more conspicuous population in prairie cities than elsewhere in the country and certain elements of aboriginal speech in English are sometimes to be heard. Similarly, the linguistic legacy, mostly intonation but also speech patterns and syntax, of the Scandinavian, Slavic and German settlers – who are far more numerous and historically important in the Prairies than in Ontario or the Maritimes – can be heard in the general milieu. Again, the large Métis population in Saskatchewan and Manitoba also carries with it certain linguistic traits inherited from French, Aboriginal and Celtic forebears.
Some terms are derived from immigrant groups or are just local inventions:
 bluff: small group of trees isolated by prairie
 bunny hug: elsewhere hoodie or hooded sweat shirt (mainly in Saskatchewan, but also in Manitoba)
 ginch/gonch/gitch/gotch: underwear (usually men's or boys' underwear, more specifically briefs; whereas women's underwear are gotchies), probably of Eastern European or Ukrainian origin. Gitch and gotch are primarily used in Saskatchewan and Manitoba while the variants with an n are common in Alberta and British Columbia.
 jam buster: jelly-filled doughnut.
 porch climber: moonshine or homemade alcohol. Porch climber has a slightly distinguished meaning in Ontario where it refers to a beverage mixed of beer, vodka, and lemonade.
 slough: pond – usually a pond on a farm
 Vi-Co: occasionally used in Saskatchewan instead of chocolate milk. Formerly a brand of chocolate milk.

In farming communities with substantial Ukrainian, German or Mennonite populations, accents, sentence structure and vocabulary influenced by these languages is common. These communities are most common in the Saskatchewan Valley region of Saskatchewan and Red River Valley region of Manitoba.

Descendants of marriages between Hudson's Bay Company workers of mainly Scottish descent and Cree women spoke Bungi, a creole that blends Cree and English. A few Bungi speakers can still be found in Manitoba. It is marked by no masculine, feminine or third-person pronouns.

 British Columbia 
British Columbian English decreasingly uses several words borrowed from the Chinook Jargon. The most famous and widely used of these terms are skookum and saltchuck. In the Yukon, cheechako is used for newcomers or greenhorns.

 Ontario 
Northern Ontario English has several distinct qualities stemming from its large Franco-Ontarian population. As a result several French and English words are used interchangeably. A number of phrases and expressions may also be found in Northern Ontario that are not present in the rest of the province, such as the use of camp for a summer home where Southern Ontario speakers would idiomatically use cottage.

In the early 2010s, certain words from London slang, Jamaican Patois, and Arabic were incorporated into the local variety of English by Toronto youth, especially in immigrant communities, thus giving rise to Toronto slang. These examples included words such as mandem, styll, wallahi, wasteman, and yute.

 Informal speech 
One of the most distinctive Canadian phrases is the spoken interrogation or tag eh. The only usage of eh exclusive to Canada, according to the Canadian Oxford Dictionary, is for "ascertaining the comprehension, continued interest, agreement, etc., of the person or persons addressed" as in, "It's four kilometres away, eh, so I have to go by bike." In that case, eh? is used to confirm the attention of the listener and to invite a supportive noise such as mm or oh or okay. This usage is also common in Queensland, Australia and New Zealand. Other uses of eh – for instance, in place of huh? or what? meaning "please repeat or say again" – are also found in parts of the British Isles and Australia. It is common in Northern/Central Ontario, the Maritimes and the Prairie provinces. The word eh is used quite frequently in the North Central dialect, so a Canadian accent is often perceived in people from North Dakota, Michigan, Minnesota, and Wisconsin.

A rubber in the US and Canada is slang for a condom. In Canada, it sometimes means an eraser (as in the United Kingdom and Ireland).

The word bum can refer either to the buttocks (as in Britain), or to a homeless person (as in the US). The "buttocks" sense does not have the indecent character it retains in British use, as it and "butt" are commonly used as a polite or childish euphemism for ruder words such as arse (commonly used in Atlantic Canada and among older people in Ontario and to the west) or ass, or mitiss (used in the Prairie Provinces, especially in northern and central Saskatchewan; probably originally a Cree loanword). Older Canadians may see "bum" as more polite than "butt", which before the 1980s was often considered rude.

Similarly the word pissed can refer either to being drunk (as in Britain), or being angry (as in the US), though anger is more often said as pissed off, while piss drunk or pissed up is said to describe inebriation (though piss drunk is sometimes also used in the US, especially in the northern states).

The term Canuck simply means Canadian in its demonymic form, and, as a term used even by Canadians themselves, it is not considered derogatory. (In the 19th century and early 20th century it tended to refer to French-Canadians.) The only Canadian-built version of the popular World War I-era American Curtiss JN-4 Jenny training biplane aircraft, the JN-4C, 1,260 of which were built, got the "Canuck" nickname; so did another aircraft, the Fleet Model 80, built from the mid-1940s until the late 1950s. The nickname Janey Canuck was used by Anglophone women's rights writer Emily Murphy in the 1920s and the Johnny Canuck comic book character of the 1940s. Throughout the 1970s, Canada's winning World Cup men's downhill ski team was called the "Crazy Canucks" for their fearlessness on the slopes. It is also the name of the Vancouver Canucks, the National Hockey League team of Vancouver, British Columbia.

The term hoser, popularized by Bob & Doug McKenzie, typically refers to an uncouth, beer-swilling male and is a euphemism for "loser" coming from the earlier days of hockey played on an outdoor rink and the losing team would have to hose down the ice after the game so it froze smooth. Bob & Doug also popularized the use of Beauty, eh, another western slang term which may be used to describe something as being of interest or note or deserving approval. 

A Newf or Newfie is someone from Newfoundland and Labrador; sometimes considered derogatory. In Newfoundland, the term Mainlander refers to any Canadian (sometimes American, occasionally Labradorian) not from the island of Newfoundland. Mainlander is also occasionally used derogatorily.

In the Maritimes, a Caper or "Cape Bretoner" is someone from Cape Breton Island, a Bluenoser is someone with a thick, usually southern Nova Scotia accent or as a general term for a Nova Scotian (including Cape Bretoners), while an Islander is someone from Prince Edward Island (the same term is used in British Columbia for people from Vancouver Island, or the numerous islands along it). A Haligonian refers to someone from the city of Halifax.

Cape Bretoners and Newfies (from Newfoundland and Labrador) often have similar slang. "Barmp" is often used as the sound a car horn makes, example: "He cut me off so I barmped the horn at him". When saying "B'y", while sounds like the traditional farewell, it is a syncopated shortening of the word "boy", referring to a person, example: "How's it goin, b'y?". Another slang that is commonly used is "doohickey" which means an object, example: "Pass me that doohickey over there". When an individual uses the word "biffed", they mean that they threw something. Example: "I got frustrated so I biffed it across the room".

 Other Canadianisms 
 The alphanumeric code appended to mail addresses (the equivalent of the similar British postcode and the all-numeric American ZIP code) is called a postal code.
 The term First Nations is often used in Canada to refer to what are called American Indians or Native Americans in the United States. This term does  include the Métis and Inuit.  "Aboriginal peoples" is preferred when all three groups are included. The term Eskimo has been replaced by the term Inuit in the past few decades. It is now considered offensive to use the term Eskimo, but is still used commonly (without pejorative intent) by those born in the early-mid-20th century.
 "Going camping" still refers to staying in a tent in a campground or wilderness area, while "going out to camp" may refer to a summer cottage or home in a rural area. "Going to camp" refers to children's summer camps. In British Columbia, "camp" was used as a reference for certain company towns (for example, Bridge River). It is used in western Canada to refer to logging and mining camps such as Juskatla Camp. It is also a synonym for a mining district; the latter occurs in names such as Camp McKinney and usages such as "Cariboo gold camp" and "Slocan mining camp" for the Cariboo goldfields and Slocan silver-galena mining district, respectively. A "cottage" in British Columbia is generally a small house, perhaps with an English design or flavour, while in southern Ontario it more likely means a second home on a lake. Similarly, "chalet" – originally a term for a small warming hut – can mean a second home of any size, but refers to one located in a ski resort. In Northern Ontario, these second homes tend to be called "camps". In Western Canada, these second homes tend to be called "cabins". A "bunkie" is a secondary building at these second homes that are small enough to require no building permits and house extra guests visiting.
 One of the other distinctions between Canadian English and British English is the use of the phrase "try to + infinitive" versus the use of the phrase "try and + infinitive". Canadian English uses "try to" while British English uses "try and". Originally, the distinction did not exist, but through the evolution of the French term , meaning to 'sort', into the English try, a number of meanings were adopted along the way, including 'attempt'. Canadian English speakers use "try and" 30% of the time while British English speakers use it 73% of the time. Since the 2000s, the two terms have had equally frequent usage in British English.
 A stagette is a female bachelorette party (US) or hen party (UK).
 A "shag" is thought, erroneously, to be derived from "shower" and "stag", and describes a dance where alcohol, entry tickets, raffle tickets, and so on, are sold to raise money for the engaged couple's wedding. Normally a Northwest Ontario, Northern Ontario and sometimes Manitoba term, a "stag and doe" or "buck and doe" is used elsewhere in Ontario. The more common term for this type of event in Manitoba is a "social". In many contexts shag can also refer to intercourse.
 The humidex is a measurement used by meteorologists to reflect the combined effect of heat and humidity (vs. US term heat index quantifying the apparent temperature).
 The States: Commonly used to refer to the United States or almost as often the U.S., much less often U.S.A. or America which are commonly used in other countries, the latter more often used in other English-speaking nations.
 Drop the gloves: to begin a fight. A reference to a practice in hockey of removing gloves prior to fighting, and the idiom "throw down the gauntlet" as well as a reference to medieval knights and gentlemen.
 Back east typically means 'Ontario or possibly Quebec' whereas Down East instead refers to the Maritimes. The former term is also used in the US to describe someone from east of the Mississippi River (e.g. I'm moving back East, She's from back East); the latter term is used in New England, especially in areas very close to Atlantic Canada, to refer to the two eastern coastal counties of Maine (i.e. I'm going Down East for the weekend.)

 Attitudes 
In 2011, just under 21.5 million Canadians, representing 65% of the population, spoke English most of the time at home, while 58% declared it their mother language. English is the major language everywhere in Canada except Quebec, and most Canadians (85%) can speak English. While English is not the preferred language in Quebec, 36.1% of the Québécois can speak English. Nationally, Francophones are five times more likely to speak English than Anglophones are to speak French – 44% and 9% respectively. Only 3.2% of Canada's English-speaking population resides in Quebec—mostly in Montreal.

Attitude studies on Canadian English are somewhat rare. A perceptual study on Albertan and Ontarians exists in combination with older literature from the 1970s–80s. Sporadic reports can be found in the literature, e.g. on Vancouver English, in which more than 80% believe in a "Canadian way of speaking", with those with a university education reporting higher than those without.

Jaan Lilles argues in an essay for English Today that there is no variety of "Canadian English". He acknowledges that no variety of English is more "real" or "natural" than any other, but that, in the words of American linguist John Algeo, "All linguistic varieties are fictions." According to Lilles, Canadian English is simply not a "useful fiction". He goes on to argue that too often national identity is conflated with linguistic identity, and that in the case of "Canadian English", supposedly unique features of Canadian speakers, such as certain lexical terms such as muskeg are artificially exaggerated to distinguish Canadian speech primarily from that found in the United States.

 See also 

 List of Canadian English dictionaries
 Dictionary of Canadianisms on Historical Principles, Second Edition
 American and British English spelling differences
 Bungi creole
 Canadian Gaelic
 Franglais
 Regional accents of English
Canadian Language Museum

 Notes 

 References 

 Further reading 

 
 
 Barber, Katherine, editor (2004). Canadian Oxford Dictionary, second edition. Toronto: Oxford University Press. .
 Barber, Katherine. "11 Favourite Regionalisms Within Canada", in David Vallechinsky and Amy Wallace (2005). The Book of Lists, Canadian Edition. Knopf. .
 Boberg, Charles (2005). "The North American Regional Vocabulary Survey: Renewing the study of lexical variation in North American English." American Speech 80/1. Dukejournals.org
 Boberg, Charles, Sounding Canadian from Coast to Coast: Regional accents in Canadian English, McGill University.
 Courtney, Rosemary, and others., senior editors (1998). The Gage Canadian Dictionary, second edition. Toronto: Gage Learning Corp. .
 Chambers, J.K. (1998). "Canadian English: 250 Years in the Making," in The Canadian Oxford Dictionary, 2nd ed., p. xi.
 Clark, Joe (2008). Organizing Our Marvellous Neighbours: How to Feel Good About Canadian English (e-book). .
 
 
 Peters, Pam (2004). The Cambridge Guide to English Usage. Cambridge: Cambridge University Press. .
 
 Canadian Raising: O'Grady and Dobrovolsky, Contemporary Linguistic Analysis: An Introduction, 3rd ed., pp. 67–68.
 Canadian English: Editors' Association of Canada, Editing Canadian English: The Essential Canadian Guide, 2nd ed. (Toronto: McClelland & Stewart, 2000).
 Canadian usage: Margery Fee and Janice McAlpine, Guide to Canadian English Usage (Toronto: Oxford University Press, 2001).
 Hamilton, Sandra A. M. (1997) Canadianisms and their treatment in dictionaries, Thesis (M.A.), University of Ottawa, 
 Canadian newspaper and magazine style guides:
 J.A. McFarlane and Warren Clements, The Globe and Mail Style Book: A Guide to Language and Usage, 9th ed. (Toronto: McClelland & Stewart, 1998).
 The Canadian Press, The Canadian Press Stylebook, 13th ed. and its quick-reference companion CP Caps and Spelling, 16th ed. (both Toronto: Canadian Press, 2004).
 Barber, Katherine, editor (2004). Canadian Oxford Dictionary, second edition. Toronto: Oxford University Press. .
 Chambers, J.K. (1998). "Canadian English: 250 Years in the Making," in The Canadian Oxford Dictionary, 2nd ed., p. xi.
 Clarke, Sandra, Ford Elms, and Amani Youssef (1995). "The third dialect of English: Some Canadian evidence", in Language Variation and Change, 7:209–228.
Dollinger, Stefan (2015). The Written Questionnaire in Social Dialectology: History, Theory, Practice. Amsterdam/Philadelphia: Benjamins. The book's examples are exclusive taken from Canadian English and represent one of the more extensive collections of variables for Canadian English.
 Dollinger, Stefan (2008). New-Dialect Formation in Canada: Evidence from the English Modal Auxiliaries 1776–1849. Amsterdam & Philadelphia: Benjamins.
 Dollinger, Stefan, Laurel J. Brinton and Margery Fee (2013). DCHP-1 Online: A Dictionary of Canadiansims on Historical Principles. 1st Edition. Ed. by Walter S. Avis et al. (1967).
 Peters, Pam (2004). The Cambridge Guide to English Usage''. Cambridge: Cambridge University Press. .

External links 

 Termium Plus: the Government of Canada terminology and linguistic databank
 Canadian Broadcasting Corporation's Words: Woe & Wonder
 Dave VE7CNV's Truly Canadian Dictionary of Canadian Spelling – comparisons of Canadian English, American English, British English, French, and Spanish
 'Hover & Hear' pronunciations in a standard Canadian accent, and compare side by side with other English accents from around the world.
 Canadian Oxford Dictionaries (Oxford University Press – sales only)
 Lexical, grammatical, orthographic and phonetic Canadianisms
 Varieties of English: Canadian English from the University of Arizona
 Dictionary of Newfoundland English
  Dictionary of Canadianisms on Historical Principles Online
 Second Edition of A Dictionary of Canadianisms on Historical Principles

 
Dialects of English
 
North American English